Anatoli Nikolaevich Boukreev (January 16, 1958 – December 25, 1997) was a Soviet and Kazakhstani mountaineer who made ascents of 10 of the 14 eight-thousander peaks—those above —without supplemental oxygen. From 1989 through 1997, he made 18 successful ascents of peaks above 8000 m.

Boukreev had a reputation as an elite mountaineer in international climbing circles for summiting K2 in 1993 and Mount Everest via the North Ridge route in 1995, and for his solo speed ascents of some of the world's highest mountains. He became even more widely known for saving the lives of climbers during the 1996 Mount Everest disaster. 

In 1997, Boukreev was killed in an avalanche during a winter ascent of Annapurna in Nepal.  Boukreev's companion, Linda Wylie, edited his memoirs and published them in 2002 under the title, Above the Clouds: The Diaries of a High-Altitude Mountaineer.

Biography
Boukreev was born in Korkino, within the Soviet Union's Russian SFSR. He came from the narod, the common people, and his parents were both poor.  After completing high school in 1975, he attended Chelyabinsk University for Pedagogy, where he majored in physics and earned his Bachelor of Science degree in 1979. At the same time, he also completed a coaching program for cross-country skiing.

After graduation, the 21-year-old dreamed of mountain climbing. Boukreev moved to Alma-Ata, the capital of the neighbouring Kazakh SSR (present day Kazakhstan) located in the Tian Shan mountain range. From 1985 he was part of a Kazakhstani mountaineering team, and he became a citizen of Kazakhstan in 1991 after the breakup of the Soviet Union.

Boukreev worked as a commercial guide in the 1990s, and was working with Scott Fischer's adventure company Mountain Madness during the 1996 Mount Everest disaster. He managed to survive and was also instrumental in saving the lives of others, including New York socialite Sandy Hill Pittman.

Climbing accomplishments

Highlights
1987
Lenin Peak (7,134 m) – First solo ascent
1989
April 15 Kangchenjunga (8,586 m) – new route with Second Soviet Himalaya Expedition
April 30 - May 2 Kangchenjunga – first traverse of the four 8,000 m summits of the massif
1990
April Denali – Cassin Ridge route
May Denali – West Rib route (solo)
1991
May 10 Dhaulagiri – new route on the west wall with First Kazakhstan Himalaya Expedition
October 7 Mount Everest – South Col route
1993
May 14 Denali (6,193 m)
July 30 K2 (8,611 m) Abruzzi route.
1994
April 29 Makalu II (8,460 m)
May 15 Makalu (8,476 m)
1995
May 17 Mount Everest – North Ridge route
June 30 Peak Abai (4,010 m) – guide for President of Kazakhstan
October 8 Dhaulagiri (8,176 m) – fastest ascent record (17h 15m)
December 8 Manaslu (8,156 m) – with Second Kazakhstan Himalaya Expedition
1996
May 10 Mount Everest – South Col route
May 17 Lhotse – solo ascent, speed record  at 21 h 16 min from Base Camp to summit without supplemental oxygen.
September 25 Cho Oyu (8,201 m) with Third Kazakhstan Himalaya Expedition
October 9 North summit of Shishapangma (8,008 m)
1997
April 24 Mount Everest (8,848 m) South Col Route as guide for Indonesian military expedition
May 23 Lhotse (8,516 m)
July 7 Broad Peak (8,047 m) – solo ascent
July 14 Gasherbrum II (8,035 m) – solo ascent

Denali
In May 1990, Boukreev was invited by an American climber to guide several clients to the summit of Denali in Alaska. Denali, previously known as Mount McKinley, has challenges such as hidden crevasses and unpredictably cold weather due to its proximity to the Arctic Circle and the ocean.

The expedition was a success and the team reached the summit and returned without incident.  During the climb there had been somewhat of a language barrier and Boukreev felt the sting of needing to borrow equipment due to his economic circumstances.  After the team had returned home, Boukreev decided to attempt a solo speed ascent of Denali before returning to the Soviet Union.

Boukreev's solo speed ascent of Denali in 1990 was completed in 10½ hours from the base to the summit.  That season acclimatised climbers were normally taking three to four days and five camps to summit — Boukreev's feat was noted by Climbing magazine in a 1990 issue, and commented on by Denali Park rangers who described it as "unreal".

K2
In 1993, Boukreev reached the summit of K2 via the Abruzzi Spur, where he shared the peak with team members Peter Metzger of Germany and Andrew Lock of Australia. The other team members were German climbers Reinmar Joswig (the team leader) and Ernst Eberhardt.  With a peak elevation of 8,611 metres (28,251 ft), K2 is the second-highest mountain on Earth after Mount Everest.

As part of the Karakoram range, K2 is located on the border between Pakistan and China. K2 is referred to as the "Savage Mountain" — notable for its steep pyramidal relief, dropping quickly in almost all directions, and the inherent danger in climbing it.
The danger facing Boukreev on K2 was that the summit felt like the finish line. Boukreev would later write that he did not feel the emotions of victory in that moment on top of K2's peak because he was physically and emotionally spent.  Boukreev found himself in a dangerous position.  He had expended too much energy placing fixed lines along a narrow, steep portion earlier that day.  But since the team wanted to push on to the summit that same afternoon, rather than return to their tents to sleep and make a summit bid the next morning, Boukreev acquiesced.  Boukreev would later write:

Boukreev later described feeling like a "squeezed lemon".  When Boukreev and the other two climbers began their descent just after sundown they met Reinmar Joswig ascending and near the peak.  Relying heavily on intuition and his previous mountaineering experiences, Boukreev slowly made his way down the steep rock and ice of the mountain.  A crampon kept coming off of his boot, and at one point he had to use his ice axe to arrest a fall, keeping himself from sliding into the abyss. Eventually he made his way to the tents at the highest elevation camp.  However, teammates Peter Metzger and Reinmar Joswig never returned from the summit, both having fallen to their death during the descent.

Everest

Boukreev became widely known as the lead climbing guide for the Mountain Madness expedition headed by Scott Fischer in May 1996. The expedition was one of several attempting to summit Everest on the same day (May 10). Soon after summiting on May 10 a disastrous blizzard struck, stranding many climbers above the South Col overnight, and by May 11, eight climbers from three different expeditions had perished. Boukreev rescued three climbers stranded in the disaster above 8000 m, and all six of the climbing clients on the Mountain Madness expedition survived the ordeal.

Galen Rowell described Boukreev's rescue efforts in the Wall Street Journal as:

Controversy
Author Jon Krakauer was generally critical of Boukreev in his book, Into Thin Air.  Subsequently, Boukreev was contacted by various media for a response, and also wrote his own account of the events on Everest in The Climb, a book co-written with Gary Weston DeWalt.

The core of the controversy was Boukreev's decision to attempt the summit without supplementary oxygen and to descend to the camp ahead of his clients in the face of approaching darkness and blizzard. He was one of the first to reach the summit on the day of the disaster and stayed at or near the summit for nearly 1.5 hours helping others with their summit efforts, before returning to his tent by 5 pm on May 10, well ahead of the later summiters on his team.

Boukreev's supporters point to the fact that his return to camp allowed him enough rest that, when the blizzard had subsided around midnight, he was able to mount a rescue attempt and to lead several climbers still stranded on the mountain back to the safety of the camp. Boukreev's detractors say that had he simply stayed with the clients, he would have been in better position to assist them down the mountain, though every one of Boukreev's clients survived, including the three (Pittman, Fox, Madsen) that he rescued on May 11 after he had rested and overcome hypoxia. The only client deaths that day were suffered by the Adventure Consultants expedition, led by guide Rob Hall, who lost his own life when he chose to stay and help a client complete a late summit rather than helping the client descend. Reinhold Messner criticized Boukreev, saying "[n]o one should guide Everest without using bottled oxygen" while David Breashears pointed out that Boukreev, despite climbing down first, was "sitting in his tent unable to assist anyone" until the clients themselves staggered into the camp with the information vital to their rescue.

According to Krakauer, Boukreev's "refusal or inability to play the role of a conventional guide" caused dissension between him and Scott Fischer (who later died while returning from the summit). On the way to the summit, Fischer had directed Boukreev to bring up the rear of the group and keep an eye on everybody, but he instead remained at Base Camp and followed the group some five hours later. When a client named Dale Kruse fell ill, Boukreev was nowhere to be found, forcing Fischer to descend from Camp II to Kruse and help him back to Base Camp. According to Krakauer, Fischer encountered Boukreev at the Khumbu Icefall and "harshly reprimanded the guide for shirking his responsibilities". Back at Base Camp, Fischer called his Seattle business partner Karen Dickinson and publicist Jane Bromet to complain about Boukreev's actions before resuming his ascent.

Before returning to the U.S. after the events on Everest in 1996, Boukreev climbed the  Lhotse, which is in proximity to Everest. He decided on a solo ascent because he hoped that in the process of climbing it he might find some inner clarity to what had just transpired on Everest.

In 1997 Anatoli Boukreev was awarded the David A. Sowles Memorial Award by the American Alpine Club. The award recognizes people "who have distinguished themselves, with unselfish devotion at personal risk or sacrifice of a major objective, in going to the assistance of fellow climbers imperiled in the mountains. It is dedicated to the memory of David A. Sowles." It was presented to him by Jim Wickwire, the first American to summit K2. The award is the American Alpine Club's highest award for valor in recognition of his role in rescuing climbers in the 1996 Everest disaster.

Death
Three weeks after receiving the David A. Sowles Memorial Award, Boukreev began his attempt to climb the south face of Annapurna I along with Simone Moro, an accomplished Italian mountaineer. They were accompanied by Dimitri Sobolev, a cinematographer from Kazakhstan who was documenting the attempt. On December 25 around noon, Boukreev and Moro were fixing ropes in a couloir at around the  level. 

The avalanche knocked Moro down the mountain where he landed just above their tent at Camp I . Fortuitously, Moro had somehow stayed near the top of the avalanche debris and managed to dig himself out after a few minutes. Unable to see or hear any signs of Boukreev or Sobolev (whom Moro had witnessed disappearing beneath "car-sized blocks of ice"), Moro descended to Annapurna base camp where he was flown by helicopter back to Kathmandu for surgery on his hands, which had been ripped down to the tendons during the fall.

News of the accident reached New Mexico on December 26. Linda Wylie, Boukreev's girlfriend, left for Nepal on December 28. Several attempts were made to reach the avalanche site by helicopter but inclement weather in late December prevented search teams from reaching Camp I. On January 3, 1998, searchers were finally able to reach Camp I and an empty tent. Linda Wylie subsequently issued a somber statement from Kathmandu:
This is the end... there are no hopes of finding him alive.

Boukreev had dreamt in detail of dying in an avalanche nine months before his death.  The only thing missing was the name of the mountain. When Boukreev's companion tried to convince him to take a different path in life to avoid a fate that Boukreev was convinced of, he responded, "Mountains are my life...my work.  It is too late for me to take up another road."

Memorial
At the site of Annapurna base-camp there is a memorial chorten to Boukreev including one of his favorite quotes:"Mountains are not stadiums where I satisfy my ambition to achieve, they are the cathedrals where I practice my religion."

On January 18, 2023, a sculpture of Boukreev by Nurlan Dalbai was unveiled at the Medeu ice sports rink. The mountaineer is shown at rest with his hand on an ice axe.

In popular culture
Icelandic actor Ingvar Eggert Sigurðsson portrays Boukreev in the Baltasar Kormákur film, Everest,  about the 1996 Everest disaster.

See also 
 List of climbers
 List of Mount Everest summiters by number of times to the summit

Bibliography
The Climb: Tragic Ambitions on Everest by Anatoli Boukreev and Gary Weston DeWalt, published by St. Martins Paperbacks, 1997, .
Above the Clouds: The Diaries of a High-Altitude Mountaineer, written by Anatoli Boukreev. Collected and edited by Linda Wylie; published by St. Martin's Griffin, 2002, .

References

External links
 Anatoli Boukreev Memorial Fund
 Photo of Anatoli Boukreev (left) and Martin Adams with Kazakhstan state flag on Everest 1996

1958 births
1997 deaths
Kazakhstani explorers
Kazakhstani mountain climbers
Kazakhstani people of Russian descent
Kazakhstani writers
Mountaineering deaths in Nepal
People from Korkino
Soviet explorers
Soviet mountain climbers
Russian Soviet Federative Socialist Republic people
Deceased Everest summiters
Deaths in avalanches
Natural disaster deaths in Nepal